The Mortal Instruments: City of Ashes was set to be a 2014 action film based on the second book of The Mortal Instruments series by Cassandra Clare.

Premise
Following the events of the prior film, City of Ashes would have followed Jace Wayland believing he is the son of Valentine Morgenstern. Valentine has stolen the Mortal Sword from the Silent Brothers as part of his plan to destroy the Clave who he believes to be corrupt. Meanwhile, the Inquisitor, played by Sigourney Weaver, wants to prove that Jace has been working for Valentine all along.

Cast
 Lily Collins as Clarissa Fray/Clarissa Morgenstern   
 Jamie Campbell Bower as Jace Wayland  
 Robert Sheehan as Simon Lewis
 Kevin Zegers as Alec Lightwood
 Jemima West as Isabelle Lightwood
 Lena Headey as Jocelyn Fray/Jocelyn Fairchild  
 Aidan Turner as Luke Garroway
 Godfrey Gao as Magnus Bane
 Jonathan Rhys Meyers as Valentine Morgenstern
 Sigourney Weaver as Imogen Herondale

Production
The film was announced on May 8, 2013, by Constantin Films, three months prior to the first installment of The Mortal Instruments films to even hit theaters. It was reported that Lily Collins would be returning as Clary Fray, in addition to Jamie Campbell Bower, and Kevin Zegers in their respective roles. In this initial announcement it was also reported that director Harald Zwart would be returning as well. In July 2013, The Hollywood Reporter announced that actress Sigourney Weaver would be joining the cast for The Mortal Instruments: City of Ashes. In an August 2013 interview, Bower revealed that the City of Ashes film was set to film in "Europe, and then Mexico, Hong Kong, back to London for two days, out here for five days, Toronto, back to England for Christmas..." In August 2013, after the film opened below expectations, Robert Kulzer, Constantin's co-president, explained that a sequel was still warranted given increasing book sales and soundtrack revenues.

Filming was set to start September 23, 2013, in Toronto Canada, but was announced to be halted September 10. The Hollywood Reporter was the first to announce on October 23, 2013, that production on The Mortal Instruments: City of Ashes would resume. Constantin Films was said to have reviewed what went wrong with the first film searching for an answer as to why it performed lower than projections estimated. Martin Moszkowicz, Constantin Film’s head of film and TV said “That [the under-performance] may have been one issue in our marketing, that we focused too much on a very young audience segment."

Scott Mendelson of Forbes magazine expressed surprise that a sequel was in production: "The Mortal Instruments: City of Bones received neither positive reviews nor box office large enough to justify its production and marketing expenses. Yet, against all odds and arguably against all logic, ... it's getting a sequel!"

In December 2013, author Cassandra Clare took to the internet to voice her thoughts on the City of Ashes delay, “I really think fans wouldn’t have been happy with the screenplay as it was,” Clare said.

On March 20, 2014, Yahoo! reported that actor and model Godfrey Gao would be reprising his role as Magnus Bane, when production started on City of Ashes.

On May 20, 2014, Harald Zwart revealed that the studio still had intentions to make the sequel, but explained that he would not direct it, so that he could focus on other projects, although he complimented the first film as "a good window [for him] to show off".

Cassandra Clare, in September 2014 at a fan meet and greet in Brazil was asked about the film and about the rewriting of the script. Clare said, "They’re re-writing, well, after the first Mortal Instruments movie came out, they got a lot of people complaining it wasn’t like the books. And so, they had a second screenplay for City of Ashes and it was even less like the books, like it was NOTHING, NOTHING like the books… Valentine had a submarine? And Magnus ran for Mayor of New York. It was very weird. So, they kinda looked at the screenplay and they looked at the fan response and they were like “We can’t do this, we have to throw the screenplay away and do a completely new screenplay that’s more like the books”. So that’s what they’ve been working on, it’s complicated cause usually if you’re doing a series of movies, you have the screenplay ready by the time the first movie has come out, you have the screenplay for the second movie so you can go right into filming it, and they didn’t have one. Takes a year to do a screenplay so I was hoping the next couple of weeks I would get to see the new screenplay for City of Ashes."

But rather than having a new screenplay ready like Clare hoped, in October 2014, it was announced that The Mortal Instruments: City of Ashes would be shelved in favor of making Shadowhunters a television series for Freeform based on The Mortal Instruments novels.

References 

Cancelled films
2010s unfinished films
Unreleased American films
The Mortal Instruments
2010s English-language films